Antonio Warren (born November 25, 1975, in San Francisco, California) is a former Canadian Football League running back who played with the BC Lions and the Calgary Stampeders.

College career
Warren attended Cal Poly San Luis Obispo University. He finished his career with over 4,000 rushing yards, 673 receiving yards, and 35 touchdowns.

Professional career

Calgary Stampeders
In 2001, with the Stampeders he led the CFL in kickoff returns and was second in punt return yardage (764).

BC Lions
He signed with the BC Lions prior to the 2004 season and replaced Kelvin Anderson as their starting running back. He had a career-high 1136 yards rushing in his first full season as a starter. He set a club record with 160 yards on 18 carries in a losing effort in the 2004 Grey Cup game against the Toronto Argonauts. That Grey Cup total ranked second All-Time, trailing only Johnny Bright's 171 yards in 1956, at the time the game was played (though Kory Sheets has since broke Bright's record in the 2013 Grey Cup with 197 yards).

In 2005, he led the CFL in rushing touchdowns with 13 and ranked second overall with 16. He led the Lions in rushing for the second straight season and was fourth in the CFL with 2,179 combined yards.
 
In 2006, Warren rushed for 169 yards in five games with the Lions before he was released in July. Joe Smith replaced him as the Lions' starting running back.

Career regular season rushing statistics

External links
Antonio Warren at CFL.ca

1975 births
American football running backs
BC Lions players
Calgary Stampeders players
Cal Poly Mustangs football players
Canadian football running backs
Players of American football from San Francisco
Players of Canadian football from San Francisco
Living people
American players of Canadian football